San Sebastián is a town and municipality in the Retalhuleu department of Guatemala.

References 

Municipalities of the Retalhuleu Department